
Gmina Cewice is a rural gmina (administrative district) in Lębork County, Pomeranian Voivodeship, in northern Poland.

Villages
Gmina Cewice contains the villages and settlements of Bukowina, Cewice, Dziechno, Kamieniec, Karwica, Krępkowice, Krępkowo, Łebunia, Lesiaki, Leśnik, Malczyce, Maszewo Lęborskie, Okalice, Oskowo, Osowiec, Osowo Lęborskie, Pieski, Popowo, Roztopczyn, Siemirowice, Święte, Unieszyniec, Unieszynko and Unieszyno.

Neighbouring gminas
Gmina Cewice is bordered by the town of Lębork and by the gminas of Czarna Dąbrówka, Łęczyce, Linia, Nowa Wieś Lęborska, Potęgowo and Sierakowice.

References
Polish official population figures 2006

Cewice
Lębork County